Conilithidae  is a proposed taxonomic family of small to medium-sized sea snails, specifically cone snails, marine gastropod mollusks in the superfamily Conoidea, the cone snails and their allies.

In 2009, John K. Tucker and Manuel J. Tenorio proposed elevating the subfamily Conilithinae (previously placed in the family Conidae) to the rank of family.  This was based on a cladistic analysis of anatomical characters, including the radular tooth, the morphology (i.e. shell characters), as well as an analysis of prior molecular phylogeny studies, all of which were used to construct phylogenetic trees.  In their phylogeny, Tucker and Tenorio noted the close relationship of the various species within the genera in the Conilithidae; this also corresponded to the results of prior molecular studies by Puillandre et al..  Tucker and Tenorio's proposed classification system for the cone shells and their allies (and the other clades of Conoidean gastropods) is set forth at Tucker & Tenorio cone snail taxonomy 2009.

Like other species in the superfamily Conoidea, these snails are predatory and venomous, able to inject neurotoxins into their prey with their radula.  The species in this family are capable of "stinging" humans, therefore live ones should be handled carefully or not at all.

Genera
Proposed genera within the Conilithidae include:

Bathyconus Tucker & Tenorio, 2009
Californiconus Tucker & Tenorio, 2009
Conasprella Thiele, 1929
Dalliconus Tucker & Tenorio, 2009
Fusiconus da Motta, 1991
Globiconus Tucker & Tenorio, 2009
Jaspidiconus Petuch, 2004
Kohniconus Tucker & Tenorio, 2009
Lilliconus Raybaudi Massilia, 1994
Parviconus Cotton & Godfrey, 1932
Perplexiconus Tucker & Tenorio, 2009
Profundiconus Kuroda, 1956
Pseudoconorbis Tucker & Tenorio, 2009
Quasiconus Tucker & Tenorio, 2009
Viminiconus Tucker & Tenorio, 2009
Ximeniconus Emerson & Old, 1962
Yeddoconus Tucker & Tenorio, 2009

Significance of "alternative representation"
Prior to 2009, all cone species were placed within the family Conidae and were placed in one genus, Conus. In 2009 however, J.K. Tucker and M.J. Tenorio proposed a classification system for the over 600 recognized species that were in the family. Their classification proposed 3 distinct families and 82 genera for the living species of cone snails, including the family Conilithidae. This classification was based upon shell morphology, radular differences, anatomy, physiology, cladistics, with comparisons to molecular (DNA) studies. Recent published accounts of the family Conilithidae and its genera include J.K. Tucker & M.J. Tenorio (2009), Tucker & Stahlschmidt (2010), Tucker, Tenorio & Stahlschmidt (2011),  Bouchet et al. (2011), Puillandre et al. (2011), Tucker & Tenorio (2011), Petuch & Sargent (2011), and Petuch & Drolshage (2011).

Testing in order to try to understand the molecular phylogeny of the Conidae was initially begun by Christopher Meyer and Alan Kohn, and is continuing, particularly with the advent of nuclear DNA testing in addition to mDNA testing.

However, as of December 2011, some experts still prefer to use the traditional classification, where all species are placed in Conus within the single family Conidae: for example, according to the current November 2011 version of the World Register of Marine Species, all species within the family Conidae are in the genus Conus. The binomial names of species in the 82 cone snail genera listed in Tucker & Tenorio 2009 are recognized by the World Register of Marine Species as "alternative representations."  Debate within the scientific community regarding this issue continues, and additional molecular phylogeny studies are being carried out in an attempt to clarify the issue.

References

Further reading
 Kohn A. A. (1992). Chronological Taxonomy of Conus, 1758-1840". Smithsonian Institution Press, Washington and London.
 Monteiro A. (ed.) (2007). The Cone Collector 1: 1-28.
 Berschauer D. (2010). Technology and the Fall of the Mono-Generic Family'' The Cone Collector 15: pp. 51–54

External links
 Gastropods.com: Conilithidae setting forth the genera and species recognized therein.